Nao Kobayashi (born 27 October 1993) is a Japanese swimmer. She competed in the women's 200 metre butterfly event at the 2018 FINA World Swimming Championships (25 m), in Hangzhou, China.

References

External links
 

1993 births
Living people
Japanese female butterfly swimmers
Place of birth missing (living people)
Universiade medalists in swimming
Universiade silver medalists for Japan
Universiade bronze medalists for Japan
21st-century Japanese women